Makhan Malai or Malai Makkhan also called 'Malaiyo or Nimish is a sweet snack made from milk cream during the winters. This dessert is prepared in many parts of Uttar Pradesh especially in cities of Kanpur, Varanasi and Lucknow. Another version is available in Delhi as Daulat ki Chaat.

It takes eight hours to prepare the dessert. Preparation starts a day before with cow milk being boiled in a huge cauldron. Then, fresh cream is added and the milk is boiled again and allowed to cool under the sky. This is perhaps the most important step when the milk is exposed to dew and remains in the open for four to five hours. This is the only reason why it cannot be prepared in the summer. The heat will melt the butter. Next, dew-exposed milk is churned for three hours in the morning. Powdered sugar, yellow color, and cardamom powder are added to give it the final flavor.

References 

Indian snack foods
Uttar Pradeshi cuisine
Indian desserts
Culture of Lucknow
Culture of Varanasi